Sigma receptors (σ-receptors) are protein cell surface receptors  that bind ligands such as 4-PPBP (4-phenyl-1-(4-phenylbutyl) piperidine), SA 4503 (cutamesine), ditolylguanidine, dimethyltryptamine, and siramesine. There are two subtypes, sigma-1 receptors (σ1) and sigma-2 receptors (σ2), which are classified as sigma receptors for their pharmacological similarities, even though they are evolutionarily unrelated.

The fungal protein ERG2, a C-8 sterol isomerase, falls into the same protein family as sigma-1. Both localize to the ER membrane, although sigma-1 is also reported to be a cell surface receptor. Sigma-2 is an EXPREA domain protein (citation needed) with a mostly intracellular (ER membrane) localization.

Classification 
Because the σ-receptor was originally discovered to be agonized by benzomorphan opioids and antagonized by naltrexone, σ-receptors were originally believed to be a type of opioid receptor. When the σ1 receptor was isolated and cloned, it was found to have no structural similarity to the opioid receptors, but rather showed similarity to fungal proteins involved in sterol synthesis. At this point, they were designated as a separate class of proteins.

Function 
The function of these receptors is poorly understood. Drugs known to be σ-agonists  include cocaine, morphine/diacetylmorphine, opipramol, PCP, fluvoxamine, methamphetamine, dextromethorphan, and berberine. However, the exact role of σ-receptors is difficult to establish as many σ-agonists also bind to other targets such as the κ-opioid receptor and the NMDA glutamate receptor. In animal experiments, σ-antagonists such as rimcazole were able to block convulsions from cocaine overdose. σ-antagonists are also under investigation for use as antipsychotic medications.

The abundant neurosteroid steroid hormone DHEA is an agonist at sigma receptors and along with pregnenolone could be endogenous agonist ligands; opposed by sigma antagonistic activity from progesterone. Another endogenous ligand, N,N-dimethyltryptamine, was also found to interact with σ1.

Physiologic effects 
Physiologic effects when the σ-receptor is activated include hypertonia, tachycardia, tachypnea, antitussive effects, and mydriasis. Some σ-receptor agonists—such as cocaine, a weak σ-agonist—exert convulsant effects in animals. Behavioral reactions to σ-agonists are rather heterogeneous: some individuals find σ-receptor agonists euphoric with significant anti-depressive effects. Other individuals, however, experience dysphoria and often report feelings of malaise or anxiety.

In 2007 selective σ-receptor agonists were shown to produce antidepressant-like effects in mice.

Ligands

Agonists 

 Choline:
 3-MeO-PCP: selective for σ1 subtype, Ki = 42nM
 4-PPBP
 Afobazole: selective for σ1 subtype
 Allylnormetazocine (SKF-10047)
 Anavex 2-73
 Arketamine
 BD1031: selective for σ1 subtype
 BD1052: selective for σ1 subtype
 Berberine
 Citalopram
 Cocaine
 Dehydroepiandrosterone (DHEA)
 Dehydroepiandrosterone sulfate (DHEA-S)
 Dextromethorphan (DXM): relatively selective for σ1 subtype
 Dextrorphan
 N,N-Dimethyltryptamine (DMT)
 Dimemorfan
 Ditolylguanidine
 Escitalopram
 Fluoxetine
 Fluvoxamine
 Igmesine
 Ketamine
 L-687,384: selective for σ1 subtype
 Lamotrigine
 Memantine: selective for σ1 subtype, low affinity
 Methamphetamine
 Methylphenidate
 Noscapine 
 OPC-14523
 Opipramol
 PB-28: selective for σ2 subtype
 Pentazocine
 Pentoxyverine: selective for σ1 subtype
 Phencyclidine
 (+)-3-PPP
 PRE-084: selective for σ1 subtype
 Pregnenolone
 Pregnenolone sulfate
 SA 4503: selective for σ1 subtype
 Siramesine
 UMB23
 UMB82

Antagonists 

 AC927
 AHD1
 AZ66
 BD1008
 BD-1047: selective for σ1 subtype
 BD1060: selective for σ1 subtype
 BD1063: selective for σ1 subtype
 BD1067
 BMY-14802
 CM156: 3-(4-(4-cyclohexylpiperazin-1-yl)butyl)benzo[d]thiazole-2(3H)-thione
 E-5842
 Haloperidol
 LR132: selective for σ1 subtype
 LR172
 MS-377: selective for σ1 subtype
 NE-100: selective for σ1 subtype
 Panamesine
 Phenothiazines
 Progesterone
 Rimcazole
 S1RA (E-52862): selective for σ1 subtype
 Sertraline
 UMB100
 UMB101
 UMB103
 UMB116
 YZ-011
 YZ-069
 YZ-185

References

External links 
 

Receptors